"Fairweather Friend" is the third single by Johnny Gill from the artist's debut album under Motown. The song peaked at number 2 on the US R&B chart, number 28 on the Billboard Hot 100 charts and number 19 on the Billboard Hot Dance Club Play

Charts

Weekly charts

Year-end charts

References

1990 singles
Johnny Gill songs
Songs written by Babyface (musician)
Songs written by L.A. Reid
Songs written by Daryl Simmons
Song recordings produced by Babyface (musician)
Song recordings produced by L.A. Reid
Motown singles